Jon Anderson (born September 5, 1984) is a Greco-Roman wrestler from the United States who won a gold medal in the 85 kg division at the 2015 Pan American Games.

Anderson was born to Greg and Rhonda Anderson. He has two sisters, Jennifer and Madison. He is married to Molly and has two sons, MacArthur and Theodore. He holds a blue belt in Brazilian jiu-jitsu, and is a member of the U.S. wrestling team since 2012.

References

1984 births
Living people
American male sport wrestlers
Wrestlers at the 2015 Pan American Games
Pan American Games medalists in wrestling
Pan American Games gold medalists for the United States
Medalists at the 2015 Pan American Games
20th-century American people
21st-century American people